e-SDS, otherwise known as an extended SDS. An extended SDS is a document of chemical safety. It is much longer and detailed than the standard SDS. It consists of a standard SDS which has more subsections than the general one, and an additional annex containing one or more exposure scenario(s).

The necessity of e-SDS 

The 1907/2006/EC REACH prescribes that those substances, which:

 is produced in more than 10 tonnes/year, and
 considered as hazardous substance,

exposure scenarios have to be prepared.

These exposure scenarios have to be appended to the SDS, therefore a so-called extended SDS (e-SDS) is created.

The descriptor system

The descriptor system is created by ECHA for the use in exposure scenarios and in extended safety data sheets E-SDS
Several type of descriptors is available.

Types:
 Descriptor-list for sectors of use (SU)
 Descriptor-list for Chemical Product Category (PC)
 Descriptor-list for process categories (PROC)
 Description for Environmental Release Categories (ERC)

Useful information

Main duties of downstream users
A brief REACH overview for distributors

Chemical safety

de:E-SDS